This is a list of Stradivarius string instruments  made by members of the house of Antonio Stradivari.

Stradivarius instruments

Violins
This list has 282 entries.

Early period: 1666–1699

Golden period: 1700–1725

Late period: 1726–1737

Violas
There are twelve known extant Stradivari violas.

Cellos
Antonio Stradivari built between 70 and 80 cellos in his lifetime, of which 63 are extant.

Guitars
Five complete guitars by Stradivari exist, and a few fragments of others – including the neck of a sixth guitar, owned by the Conservatoire de Musique in Paris. These guitars have ten (doubled, five-course) strings, which was typical of the era.

Harps
The only surviving Stradivarius harp is the arpetta (little harp), owned by San Pietro a Maiella Music Conservatory in Naples, Italy.

Mandolins
There are two known extant Stradivari mandolins. The Cutler-Challen Choral Mandolino of 1680 is in the collection of the National Music Museum at the University of South Dakota in Vermillion, South Dakota. The other, dated ca. 1706, is owned by private collector Charles Beare of London. Known as Mandolino Coristo, it has eight strings.

Bows
A Stradivarius bow, The King Charles IV Violin Bow attributed to the Stradivari Workshop, is currently in the collection of the National Music Museum Object number: 04882, at the University of South Dakota in Vermillion, South Dakota. The Rawlins Gallery violin bow, NMM 4882, is attributed to the workshop of Antonio Stradivari, Cremona, ca. 1700. This is one of two bows attributed to the workshop of Antonio Stradivari. The other was part or the Amaryllis Fleming Collection, the Paul Rosenbaum Collection, and the Maurice and Marta Clare Collection. It is currently in a private collection in Munich.

References

Stradivarius